Netherlands competed at the 1994 Winter Paralympics in Lillehammer, Norway. The team included 6 athletes, 5 men and 1 women. Competitors from Netherlands won 4 medals, including 1 gold and 3 bronze to finish 15th in the medal table.

Medalists

Source: www.paralympic.org & www.olympischstadion.nl

Alpine skiing

 Kjeld Punt
 Robert Reijmers
 Martijn Wijsman

Biathlon

 Marjorie van de Bunt

Cross-country skiing

 Marjorie van de Bunt

Ice sledge speed racing

 Eelco Kooistra
 Arthur Overtoom

See also
Netherlands at the Paralympics
Netherlands at the 1994 Winter Olympics

References

External links
International Paralympic Committee official website

Nations at the 1994 Winter Paralympics
1994
Summer Paralympics